During the 1999–2000 English football season, Bury F.C. competed in the Football League Second Division.

Season summary
In the 1999-2000 season, Bury had a disappointing campaign after relegation from the second tier of English football the previous season which at one stage saw manager Warnock resigning from his role on 2 December to take over as Sheffield United manager. Andy Preece and Steve Redmond took temporary charge until the end of the season and Bury finished the season in 15th place.

Final league table

Results
Bury's score comes first

Legend

Football League Second Division

FA Cup

League Cup

Football League Trophy

Squad

Left club during season

References

Bury F.C. seasons
Bury F.C.